Logic game may refer to:

 Logic puzzle, including Sudoku, Futoshiki, Kakuro, etc.
 Logic games, a section of the LSAT
 a game-theoretical device for defining the semantics of a logic; see game semantics
 a logic-based game; a video game programmed using transistor–transistor logic